The Holt Lock and Dam is a lock built on the Black Warrior River near Holt, Alabama in Tuscaloosa County. Opening for navigation in 1966, it served as a replacement for a series locks and dams built in the early 20th century.

The spillway is controlled by 14 individually operated tainter gates used to control the overall lake level. Located on the northern bank are hydroelectric turbines operated by the Alabama Power Company. The United States Army Corps of Engineers owns the dam facility; Alabama Power owns and operates the generating plant.

See also
Birmingham District
List of crossings of the Black Warrior River

References

External links

Transportation buildings and structures in Tuscaloosa County, Alabama
Dams in Alabama
Locks of Alabama
Hydroelectric power plants in Alabama
Crossings of the Black Warrior River
Dams completed in 1966
United States Army Corps of Engineers dams
Historic American Engineering Record in Alabama
Alabama Power dams